The 2020–21 Women's EHF Champions League was the 28th edition of Europe's premier club handball tournament, running from 12 September 2020 to 30 May 2021.

There was no defending champion, after the season before was cancelled due to the COVID-19 pandemic.

Vipers Kristiansand defeated Brest Bretagne Handball to win their first title.

Because of this pandemic, each local health department allowed a different number of spectators.

Format
The competition began with a group stage featuring 16 teams divided in two groups. Matches were played in a double round-robin system with home-and-away fixtures. In Groups A and B, originally the top two teams would have qualified for the quarterfinals, with teams ranked third to sixth entering the playoffs. After a decision by the EHF, all teams advanced.

The knockout stage included four rounds: the round of 16, quarterfinals, and a final-four tournament comprising two semifinals and the final. The teams were paired against each other in two-legged home-and-away matches, with the aggregate winners qualifying to the next round. 

In the final four tournament, the semifinals and the final were played as single matches at a pre-selected host venue.

Team allocation
A total of 21 teams from 15 countries submitted their application for a place in the competition's group stage before the deadline of 10 June 2020. The final list of 16 participants was revealed by the EHF Executive Committee on 19 June.

Group stage

The draw was held on 1 July 2020 at the EHF headquarters in Vienna, Austria. The 16 teams were drawn into two groups of eight, with the restriction that teams from the same national association could not be drawn into the same group.

In each group, teams play against each other in a double round-robin format, with home and away matches. After completion of the group stage matches, the top two teams from each group would have qualified directly for the quarterfinals, and the four teams ranked 3rd–6th advance to the playoffs, but on 10 February 2021, it was announced that all 16 teams advance from the group stage.

Group A

Group B

Note
All matches ending with a 10–0 results were assessed by the EHF.

Knockout stage

Originally, the top six teams advanced but on 10 February 2021, after a decision by the EHF Executive Committee, it was announced that all 16 teams advance from the group stage.

Round of 16

Quarterfinals

Final four

Final

Top goalscorers

Awards
The all-star team was announced on 28 May 2021.

See also 
 2020–21 Women's EHF European League

Notes

References

External links
Official website 

 
2020
2020 in handball
2021 in handball
2020 in European sport
2021 in European sport